Anoplolepis, also known as the "pugnacious ants", is a genus of ants in the subfamily Formicinae and tribe Lasiini. The genus is mainly found in the Afrotropics, with a few native species known from the Malagasy and Oriental regions (and some introduced in other places).

Species

Anoplolepis carinata (Emery, 1899)
Anoplolepis custodiens (Smith, 1858)
Anoplolepis fallax (Mayr, 1865)
Anoplolepis gracilipes (Smith, 1857)
Anoplolepis nuptialis (Santschi, 1917)
Anoplolepis opaciventris (Emery, 1899)
Anoplolepis rufescens (Santschi, 1917)
Anoplolepis steingroeveri (Forel, 1894)
Anoplolepis tenella (Santschi, 1911)

References

External links

Formicinae
Ant genera
Taxa named by Felix Santschi
Taxonomy articles created by Polbot